Michael Karas (born 1952) is a German physical chemistry scientist and Professor, known for his researches on matrix-assisted laser desorption/ionization (MALDI), a technique in mass spectrometry.

Michael Karas studied Chemistry at the University of Bonn, where he obtained a PhD in the field of physical chemistry in 1982. From 1983 to 1986, he was part of the Hillenkamp research group in the Institut für Biophysik at Johann Wolfgang Goethe University Frankfurt am Main. In 1987, he followed Hillenkamp at Münster and both formed a group in the Faculty of Medicine at University of Münster. He returned to Frankfurt in 1995 as a full professor for Instrumental Analytical Chemistry.

Awards 
 1997: Recipient of the John B. Fenn Award for a Distinguished Contribution in Mass Spectrometry
 2003: Karl Heinz Beckurts Award, Germany’s most important award for outstanding promotion of the partnership between science and industry
 2006: Thomson Medal awarded by the International Mass Spectrometry Foundation

See also
History of mass spectrometry

References

External links 
Short biography on  Frankfurt University web site
Beckurts-Preis 2003 für Michael Karas 

Living people
Mass spectrometrists
German physical chemists
20th-century German chemists
1952 births
Thomson Medal recipients